David Maupin is an American art dealer.

With Rachel Lehmann, he opened the Lehmann Maupin gallery in SoHo, Manhattan, in October 1996. Before opening Lehmann Maupin, Maupin was the director of Metro Pictures.

Early life and education
Born in California, Maupin studied art history at the University of California, Berkeley, and the University of Pennsylvania.

Lehmann Maupin gallery

History
Lehmann Maupin gallery has organized and curated exhibitions for international contemporary artists working in all media. The gallery has given a number of artists their first one-person exhibitions in New York City, including Kutluğ Ataman, Tracey Emin, Anya Gallaccio, Shirazeh Houshiary, Do-Ho Suh, and Adriana Varejão. In addition, the gallery has exposed emerging talents, such as Suling Wang, Teresita Fernández, and the Japanese artist Mr., through exhibitions at the gallery and participations in select art fairs.

The gallery's first raw, plywood-panelled space in Chelsea was designed by Rem Koolhaas in 1996. It was a  storefront gallery located at 39 Greene Street (near Grand Street). In September 2002 the gallery moved to a bigger space, also located in Chelsea. A second New York gallery at 201 Chrystie Street opened in November 2007. In 2013, Koolhaas designed a  gallery space in the historic Pedder Building in Hong Kong. The inaugural exhibition featured Korean artist Lee Bul.

Ahead of the inaugural Art Basel Hong Kong in 2013, Maupin joined the fair's selection committee.

Lehmann Maupin launched its first Seoul outpost in the city's Sogyeok-dong neighbourhood in 2017, making it one of the first international galleries to establish a permanent space in South Korea. After four years, the gallery moved to a larger gallery in the Hannam-dong area.

Lehmann Maupin's current three-story gallery space, designed by Peter Marino, opened in Chelsea in September 2018. Shortly after, the gallery inaugurated its nearly  black box space for film screenings.

In 2019, Lehmann Maupin launched operations London before opening a  space in the South Kensington district in 2020.

Artists
Lehmann Maupin represents numerous living artists, including:
 Loriel Beltrán (since 2023)
 McArthur Binion
 Lee Bul
 Dominic Chambers (since 2021)
 Billy Childish 
 Mary Corse
 Mandy El-Sayegh (since 2019)
 Tracey Emin 
 Gilbert & George
 Shirazeh Houshiary
 Catherine Opie (since 2015)
 Tony Oursler
 Helen Pashgian (since 2019)
 Lari Pittman (since 2019)
 Alex Prager
 Sung Neung Kyung (since 2023)
 Do Ho Suh
 Patrick Van Caeckenbergh (since 2014)
 Cecilia Vicuña
 Nari Ward
 Billie Zangewa (since 2020)

In addition, the gallery manages various artist estates, including: 
 Ashley Bickerton
 Heidi Bucher

Other activities
 Edible Schoolyard NYC, Member of the Board
 Perfect Earth Project, Member of the Board

Personal life
Maupin's partner is Stefano Tonchi, the editor-in-chief of the magazine W; they met in 1987 when Maupin was studying in Florence. The couple has twin daughters. Since 2011, the family has been residing at Osborne Apartments, in a space designed by Annabelle Selldorf. They also maintain a weekend house in Bridgehampton.

References

External links

Lehmann Maupin Gallery on Ocula

Living people
Year of birth missing (living people)
Place of birth missing (living people)
University of California, Berkeley alumni
University of Pennsylvania alumni
American art curators
American art directors
American art dealers